Carlos Varas (born 14 September 1970) is a Chilean biathlete. He competed in the men's 20 km individual event at the 2002 Winter Olympics.

References

1970 births
Living people
Chilean male biathletes
Olympic biathletes of Chile
Biathletes at the 2002 Winter Olympics
Sportspeople from Santiago
21st-century Chilean people